Basque pelota (Spanish: Pelota vasca and Frontón, meaning pelota court), for the 2013 Bolivarian Games, took place from 18 November to 25 November 2013.

Medal table
Key:

Medalists

References

Events at the 2013 Bolivarian Games
2013 Bolivarian Games
Basque pelota competitions in Peru
2013 in basque pelota